Imane Khelif is an Algerian amateur boxer. She represented Algeria the 2020 Summer Olympics in Tokyo.

Amateur career
In the New Delhi 2018 AIBA Women's World Boxing Championships, Imane Khelif participated for the first time, where she ranked 17th after being eliminated from the first round. Then she represented Algeria in the 2019 AIBA Women's World Boxing Championships held in Russia, where she ranked 33rd, and again she was eliminated from the first round against the landowner Natalia Shadrina. Khelif participated in the 2022 IBA Women's World Boxing Championships and became the first Algerian female boxer to reach the final after defeating the Netherlands Chelsey Heijnen. Where she face Ireland's Amy Broadhurst in the final and defeated. Before that in the first round Khelif overcame Kazakhstan's Aida Abikeyeva, then in the round of 16 Beatrice Rosenthal of Latvia by Referee stop the contest, and in the quarter-finals the Greek Olga Papadatou.

References

External links
 

1999 births
Living people
Olympic boxers of Algeria
Boxers at the 2020 Summer Olympics
Algerian women boxers
African Games competitors for Algeria
Competitors at the 2019 African Games
21st-century Algerian women
AIBA Women's World Boxing Championships medalists
People from Tiaret
20th-century Algerian women
Mediterranean Games gold medalists for Algeria
Mediterranean Games medalists in boxing
Competitors at the 2022 Mediterranean Games